"A House Is Not a Home" is a 1964 ballad written by the team of Burt Bacharach and Hal David for the 1964 film of the same name, starring Shelley Winters and Robert Taylor. The song was recorded by American singer Dionne Warwick at Bell Sound Studios in New York City, and was a modest hit in the United States for the singer, peaking at #71 on the pop singles chart as the B-side of the top 40 single, "You'll Never Get to Heaven (If You Break My Heart)". Another version of the song, by Brook Benton, which was the version that appeared in the film, was released at nearly the same time. It debuted two weeks earlier on the Billboard Hot 100. Benton's version split airplay with Warwick's, and ultimately peaked at #75.

Warwick's version of "A House Is Not a Home" fared better in Canada, where it was a top 40 hit, peaking at #37. The ballad made the R&B top 10 in Cashbox by both Warwick and Benton, with neither artist specified as best seller.

Despite its modest initial success, the song went on to achieve greater renown through frequent recordings by other artists, including a hit version in 1981 by Luther Vandross.

Production
The Warwick single was performed in the key of F major, and it is most often played in that key in jazz interpretations. Bacharach recorded and performs the song in the key of A-flat major.

Luther Vandross version

The song was recorded by R&B/soul singer-songwriter Luther Vandross on his 1981 debut album Never Too Much. The track, which was recorded at seven minutes long, was released as a single and became an R&B hit, and later one of Vandross's signature songs. His performance of the song at the 1988 NAACP Awards telecast would bring Warwick to tears.

In 2009, Essence magazine included Vandross's version of the song in their list of the "25 Best Slow Jams of All Time".

Vandross's version was sampled by Kanye West on "Slow Jamz", from his 2003 studio album The College Dropout.

Certifications

Other versions
 Following the original singles by Warwick and Benton, Bacharach himself recorded the song for his 1965 debut Hit Maker!: Burt Bacharach plays the Burt Bacharach Hits.
Ella Fitzgerald included this on her 1969 live album Sunshine of Your Love.
 
 The Temptations and The Supremes recorded a version for their joint album

 Julie Rogers recorded the song for her 1964 debut album Julie Rogers (which also featured her rendition of "The Love of a Boy").

 Ronnie Carroll recorded the song for his 1965 album Carroll Calling.

 The Anita Kerr Singers recorded an a cappella arrangement on their 1969 album Reflect.
 
 Della Reese recorded a version for her 1967 album Della on Strings of Blue. 
 
 Lainie Kazan recorded a version for her 1968 album Love is Lainie. 
 
 Cher released a version on her 1968 album Backstage.
 
 Shirley Bassey included a version on her 1968 album 12 of Those Songs.
 
 Mavis Staples recorded the song for her 1969 album Mavis Staples.
 
 British singer Lulu recorded the song for her 1969 album Lulu's Album.
 
 English rock duo The Marbles performed the song and was released on the group's 1970 self-titled album.
 
 Dusty Springfield performed the song with Bacharach on the 1970 television special Another Evening With Burt Bacharach (a performance she was "quite proud of").
 
 Barbra Streisand recorded a medley of the song with "One Less Bell to Answer" (the 5th Dimension hit) for her 1971 album Barbra Joan Streisand.
 
 Dakota Staton recorded the song for her 1972 album with organist Groove Holmes "Madame Foo-Foo".
 
 Sarah Vaughan recorded the song for her 1975 album Sarah Vaughan with the Jimmy Rowles Quintet.
 
  American pop singer Viola Wills covered the song in her unique dance/Hi-NRG style and released it as a single only with radio, vocal and house remixes in 1994. It also later appeared on her various best of/greatest hits compilations.

 In 2001, Japanese reggae artists Reggae Disco Rockers, released a reggae version of the song that very closely follows the melodies and styles of the original.
 
 In 2002, Lynne Arriale recorded the song on her album Inspiration.
 
 Ronald Isley would record his own version with Bacharach, in 2003, using essentially the same template as Luther Vandross, for the album Here I Am: Isley meets Bacharach.

 In 2005, Aretha Franklin recorded it for the tribute album So Amazing: An All-Star Tribute to Luther Vandross. The song won her the Grammy Award for Best Traditional R&B Performance at the 46th Grammy Awards, her second in the category.

 In 2006, Tina May, accompanied by pianist Nikki Iles, recorded the song on her album A Wing and a Prayer.

 In 2007, Marcia Hines recorded the songs for her album Life.

 The song is featured twice during the sixteenth episode of the first season of Glee, Home, both on its own and as a cover of the Barbra Streisand medley with "One Less Bell to Answer".

 In 2010, the song was reused in the revival of Promises, Promises.

 In 2012, Steps included the song on their festive themed album, Light Up the World.
 
 Kurt Elling recorded the song for his 2012 album 1619 Broadway - The Brill Building Project.
 
 In 2014, Warwick released a duet version of the song with singer Ne-Yo on Feels So Good.

Instrumental versions
 Various jazz musicians have performed and recorded the song, and it has thus acquired the status of a jazz standard.
 Sonny Rollins recorded a version at the 1974 Montreux Jazz Festival, released on The Cutting Edge.
 Bill Evans recorded the song for his 1977 album I Will Say Goodbye in the key of B flat major
 Ramsey Lewis recorded the song for his 1983 album Les Fleurs.
 In 1993, pianist Joe Sample included the song on the album Invitation.
 In 1995, another instrumental rendition was released on saxophonist Nelson Rangell's album Destiny.
 In 2004, Eliane Elias included the song in her album Dreamer.
In 1968, Stevie Wonder recorded an instrumental version of this song on his album "Eivets Rednow".
In 1972, alto saxophonist Karl "Cannonball" Bryan, with the Soul Vendors featuring Jackie Mittoo on keyboards, recorded the song as a reggae instrumental released as a single on Studio One with a B-side dub version called "A House is Not a Dub".*
In 2011, the Blue Devils played the song as the opener and closer to their 2011 show, "The Beat My Heart Skipped". The show fully consisted of Burt Bacharach's music.

In popular culture
Psychedelic band Love parodied the song's title on their album Forever Changes in 1967, by naming one of their songs "A House Is Not a Motel".
The song is parodied in SpongeBob SquarePants episode, "Welcome to the Chum Bucket".
Peter Hammill parodied the title on his album The Silent Corner and the Empty Stage in 1974, naming the lengthy final number "A Louse Is Not a Home".
In the song "Coming Home" by P. Diddy, the song is referenced.
"A House Is Not a Home" was one of several Bacharach/David hits added to the score of the 2010 Broadway revival of Promises, Promises (a Bacharach/David musical from 1968). It was performed by Kristin Chenoweth and later recorded again for her album "The Art of Elegance".
The song was performed twice in "Home", the sixteenth episode of the television series Glee, once by Chris Colfer and Cory Monteith, and once by Matthew Morrison and Kristin Chenoweth as part of a medley with "One Less Bell to Answer".

References

1964 songs
1964 singles
1981 singles
Aretha Franklin songs
Barbra Streisand songs
Brook Benton songs
Dionne Warwick songs
Luther Vandross songs
Perry Como songs
Songs written for films
Songs with lyrics by Hal David
Songs with music by Burt Bacharach
Viola Wills songs
Grammy Award for Best Traditional R&B Vocal Performance
1960s jazz standards
The Marbles (duo) songs
Jazz compositions in F major
Scepter Records singles
Soul ballads
Rhythm and blues ballads